Reotipur is a village located in the Ghazipur district of Uttar Pradesh, India. With a population of 28833 (2022 population census), it is the largest village in Seorai  Tehsil of the Ghazipur district.

Administration
The Gram Panchayat administrates Reotipur village through Pradhan, who is an elected representative of the village. Reotipur is the largest part of Gram Panchayat of the Ghazipur district. The town was listed under Ambedkar Gram Yojna by the former Chief Minister of Uttar Pradesh, Mayawati and as a result, it is granted special privileges for its development program. Extensive construction and maintenance work had been undertaken with the revamping of old roads with concrete ones and many new routes.

Transport and Agriculture
Reotipur is well linked to other parts of the district through both public and private transport. The nearest railway stations are Dildarnagar, Bhadaura, and Ghazipur. In terms of agriculture, Reotipur village is advantageously positioned because it is located on the banks of the Ganges river and a local river named Iqnaiya. All kinds of crops which grow in Uttar Pradesh and Buxar of Bihar are grown in the village. There are various kinds of modern machinery present in the village. The village has more than 80 tractors, 20 combine harvesters, and 8 balers for harvesting the crops. The village has solar tube wells for a more reliable electricity supply. The village has several shops. The water level of the village is not more than 100 ft.

Bhagwati Temple
After the defeat in the Battle of Khanwa and the Battle of Madarpur, there were three brothers named  Maharaja Kam Dev Mishra, Maharaja Dam Dev Mishra, and Maharaja Vikram Pratap Dev Mishra (Bairam Dev) who were sons of Maharaja Jay Raj Dev Mishra. Kam and Dam came to this region and the third brother (Vikram Pratap) moved to another place. According to local tradition, Kam Dev Singh and Dam Dev Singh brought a statue of a goddess from Fatehpur Sikri (where they ruled before), and installed it at the temple in Reotipur the construction of the present maa bhagwati temple was done by Jai karan rai( Lambardar) by asking for donations from the villagers . Raghunandan Brahma Baba temple is another major temple in Reotipur.

Education
Reotipur has several educational organizations including government and private educational institutions. Reotipur has more than 15 private schools and more than 5 government schools. Nehru Vidya Pith is the most popular government school while RNR international, BSD public school are top private schools. There is also a degree-granting college for higher education (graduate and post-graduate studies) named Gadadhar Shloka Mahavidyalaya and three Sanskrit Mahavidyalaya which also have a study center of Uttar Pradesh Rajarshi Tandon Open University (UPRTOU, Prayagraj). These affiliated colleges offer traditional undergraduate, postgraduate and Ph.D. degrees in different subject areas.

Nearby places
Ghazipur
Varanasi
Zamania
Mohammadabad
Sherpur, Ghazipur
Gahmar
Dildarnagar Kamsar

See also
Tilwa
Basuka
 Gaura
 Suhwal
 Ramaval
 Mednipur

Sherpur 
Hasanpura
Athahata
Nagsar
Sadhopur
Patakaniya

References

External links
Villages in Ghazipur Uttar Pradesh

 Cities and towns in Ghazipur district
 Villages in Ghazipur district